Robert Andrew Peebles (born 1948) is a British radio DJ, television presenter, and cricket commentator.

Born in London, Peebles attended Bishop's Stortford College. He began as a nightclub DJ in the late 1960s.

Peebles was resident DJ at the Chelsea Village disco in Glen Fern Road, Bournemouth, in the early 1970s.

He began his radio career in 1973 with BBC Radio Manchester. In 1974, Peebles was among the founding DJs of Piccadilly Radio in Manchester. After four years at Piccadilly, Peebles was a presenter on BBC Radio 1 from 1978 to 1992. During his time with the BBC, Peebles also presented 15 editions of Top of the Pops from 1979 to 1984 and broadcast for the British Forces Broadcasting Service and the BBC World Service.

John Lennon had his final radio interview on 6 December 1980 with Peebles on Radio 1, two days before Lennon was murdered. That interview was the subject of the 2020 documentary Lennon's Last Weekend directed by Brian Grant.

References

External links
Official website (archived)
Andy Peebles & His Famous Interview of John Lennon at Harvey Lisberg

People educated at Bishop's Stortford College
British radio personalities
British radio DJs
BBC Radio 1 presenters
BBC Radio 2 presenters
Living people
1948 births
Television personalities from London
Top of the Pops presenters